The 1980 PBA Invitational Championship was a short tournament featuring two foreign teams and the top three local squads of the Open Conference. It started on August 16 and ended on September 6, 1980.

Format
The following format will be observed for the duration of the tournament:
 Two-round robin eliminations; 8 games per team; Teams are then seeded by basis on win–loss records. In case of a tie, a superior quotient will determine a tie-breaker.
 The top two teams after the two-round robin will advance to the best-of-three finals series. The next two dispute third place also in a best-of-three series.

Opening ceremonies
The muses for the participating teams are as follows:

Elimination round

The end of the eliminations saw a four-way tie, with the application of the Asian quotient system of breaking ties, Stoodley/USA finish first with plus 39 quotient, Toyota finish second with a plus 16, Adidas at third with plus 15 and Crispa Walk Tall was last with plus 11.

Battle-for-third

Finals

The Tamaraws raced to a 76-62 lead early in the third period, but Larry Pounds, Ollie Matson and Ron Richardson pulled the Americans back into the game at 83-86. Kenny Tyler pushed Nicholas Stoodley ahead for only the second time at 106-105. With the Tamaraws missing easy baskets and connecting two free throws from four attempts, Tyler's back-to-back hits stayed the Americans in front, 112-107. Tyler proved to be the main man for Stoodley, his 15-foot jumper with 30 seconds left preserve their victory.

References

External links
Nicholas Stoodley@nostalgiamanila.blogspot

PBA Invitational Championship
Invitational Championship